Cognizant is an  American  multinational information technology services and consulting company. It is headquartered in Teaneck, New Jersey, United States. Cognizant is part of the NASDAQ-100 and trades under CTSH.  It was founded as an in-house technology unit of Dun & Bradstreet in 1994, and started serving external clients in 1996.

After a series of corporate re-organizations there was an initial public offering in 1998.

Cognizant had a period of fast growth during the 2000s and became a Fortune 500 company in 2011; as of 2021, it is ranked 185.

History 
Cognizant was established in 1994 in Chennai, India, as Dun & Bradstreet Satyam Software (DBSS), a 76:24 joint venture between Dun & Bradstreet and Satyam Computer Services, with Srini Raju as the founding CEO and MD. It began with 50 employees in Chennai as Dun & Bradstreet's in-house technology unit focused on implementing large-scale IT projects for Dun & Bradstreet businesses. In 1996, the company started pursuing customers beyond Dun & Bradstreet.

In 1996, Dun & Bradstreet spun off several of its subsidiaries including Erisco, IMS International, Nielsen Media Research, Pilot Software, Strategic Technologies and DBSS, to form a new company called Cognizant Corporation, headquartered in Chennai, India. Three months later, in 1997, DBSS renamed itself to Cognizant Technology Solutions. In July 1997, Dun & Bradstreet bought Satyam's 24% stake in DBSS for $3.4 million. Headquarters were moved to the United States, and in March 1998, Kumar Mahadeva was named CEO. Operating as a division of the Cognizant Corporation, the company focused on Y2K-related projects and web development.

In 1998, the parent company, Cognizant Corporation, split into two companies: IMS Health and Nielsen Media Research. After this restructuring, Cognizant Technology Solutions became a public subsidiary of IMS Health. In June 1998, IMS Health partially spun off the company, conducting an initial public offering of the Cognizant stock. The company raised $34 million, less than what the IMS Health underwriters had hoped. They earmarked the money for debt payments and upgrading company offices.

Kumar Mahadeva decided to reduce the company's dependence on Y2K projects: by Q1 1999, 26% of company's revenues came from Y2K projects, compared with 49% in early 1998. Believing that the $16.6 billion enterprise resource planning software market was saturated, Kumar Mahadeva decided to refrain from large-scale ERP implementation projects. Instead, he focused on applications management, which accounted for 37% of Cognizant's revenue in Q1 1999. Cognizant's revenues in 2002 were $229 million, and the company had zero debt with $100 million in the bank. During the dotcom bust, the company grew by taking on the maintenance projects that larger IT services companies did not want.

In 2003, IMS Health sold its entire 56% stake in Cognizant, which instituted a poison pill provision to prevent hostile takeover attempts. Kumar Mahadeva resigned as the CEO in 2003, and was replaced by Lakshmi Narayanan. Gradually, the company's services portfolio expanded across the IT services landscape and into business process outsourcing (BPO) and business consulting. Lakshmi Narayanan was succeeded by Francisco D'Souza in 2006. Cognizant experienced a period of fast growth during the 2000s, as reflected by its appearance in Fortune magazine's "100 Fastest-Growing Companies" list for ten consecutive years from 2003 to 2012.

In September 2014, Cognizant struck its biggest deal, acquiring healthcare IT services provider TriZetto Corp for $2.7 billion. Cognizant Shares, rose nearly 3 percent in pre-market trading.

On 24 June 2015, the company signed a multimillion-dollar agreement with Escorts Group in India to help Escorts' businesses in digital transformation and modernizing its operations across all business segments.

On 30 June 2015, it partnered with Singapore-based supermarket retailer NTUC FairPrice to perform digital transformation in NTUC's business to improve personalized and consistent customer service across multiple channels.

In January 2022, Cognizant sold its acquisition Oy Samlink to Kyndryl and Mustache to DJE Holdings.

Acquisitions

Business model 

Like many other IT services firms, Cognizant follows a global delivery model based on offshore software R&D and offshore outsourcing. The company has a number of offshore development centers outside the United States and near-shore centers in the U.S., Europe and South America.

In its early years, Cognizant gained business from a number of American and European companies with the help of the Dun & Bradstreet brand. The company's senior executives envisaged the firm as a provider of high-end customer services on-par with the six contemporary major system integrators (Accenture, BearingPoint, Capgemini, Ernst & Young, Deloitte and IBM), but at lower prices.

Operations

Regions 
The company has 318,400 employees globally, of which over 200,000 are in India across 10 locations with a plurality in Chennai. On 20 Jan, 1994 Cognizant registered its branch in Chennai, Tamil Nadu, India with the legal name Cognizant Technology Solutions India Private Limited. The other centers of the company are in Bangalore, Chennai, Coimbatore, Gurgaon, Noida, Hyderabad, Kochi, Kolkata, Mangalore, Mumbai, and Pune. The company has local, regional, and global delivery centers in the UK, Australia, Hungary, Netherlands, Spain, China, Philippines, Canada, Brazil, Argentina, Mexico etc.

Business units 
Cognizant is organized into several verticals and horizontal units. The vertical units focus on specific industries such as Banking & Financial Services, Insurance, Healthcare, Manufacturing and Retail. The horizontals focus on specific technologies or process areas such as Analytics, mobile computing, BPO and Testing. Both horizontal and vertical units have business consultants, who together form the organization-wide Cognizant Consulting team. Cognizant is among the largest recruiters of MBAs in the industry; they are involved in business development and business analysis for IT services projects.

Corporate affairs

Management 
Cognizant is currently led by Ravi Kumar S (CEO) from Jan 2023. Brian Humphries (Ex-CEO), Jan Siegmund (CFO) and Rajesh Nambiar (President, Digital Business & Technology).

On 1 April 2019, Francisco D'Souza was replaced by Brian Humphries as the CEO.

On 12 January 2023,  Brian Humphries was replaced by former Infosys President, Ravi Kumar Singisetti as the CEO.

Finance 

Cognizant was listed on NASDAQ in 1998, and added to the NASDAQ-100 Index in 2004. After the close of trading on 16 November 2006, Cognizant moved from the mid cap S&P 400 to the S&P 500. Cognizant became a Fortune 500 company in 2011.

Corporate social responsibility
Cognizant's philanthropic and corporate social responsibility (CSR) initiatives are conducted through the Cognizant employees for the financial and administrative support of the Cognizant Foundation. Registered in March 2005 as a "Charitable Company" under the Indian Companies Act, the Cognizant Foundation aims to help "unprivileged members of society gain access to quality education and healthcare by providing financial and technical support; designing and implementing educational and healthcare improvement programs; and partnering with Non-Government Organizations (NGOs), educational institutions, healthcare institutions, government agencies and corporations".

Cognizant has a grassroots corporate social responsibility project called Outreach, through which the volunteer employees lend their expertise for devising skill-building and workforce programs to improve the operations of NGOs.

Awards 
In 2015, the Fortune named it as the world's fourth most admired IT services company. In 2017, Cognizant was named in Fortunes Future 50 list.

Sponsorships 
Over the year 2021, Cognizant signed multiple sponsorship agreements with sports, sailing and racing teams.

In January 2021, the newly rebranded Aston Martin Formula One team announced Cognizant as their title sponsor for the 2021 Formula One World Championship and beyond. In February 2021, Cognizant signed a sponsorship deal with the PGA TOUR and LPGA Tour to become a Global Partner of the Presidents Cup and a title partner of the LPGA Tour’s Founders Cup.

Later in the year, in April, Cognizant signed an agreement to be SailGP's digital transformation partner. In June the same year, Cognizant became the Presenting Partner of THE JOHN SHIPPEN Shoot-Out Inaugural Golf Event.

Criticism and controversies

India

Bribery 
Larsen & Toubro Ltd (L&T) paid million in bribes to Indian government officials on behalf of Cognizant Technology Solutions Corp. to secure permits, ranging from environmental clearance to power. L&T has made illicit payments and Cognizant reimbursed the money by disguising it as compensation for cost overruns.

Companies Act violations 
In March 2019, significant publicity was raised because Cognizant repetitively violated the directives of the Registrar of Companies. The Company "has moved [sic] the Madras High Court fearing possibility of criminal prosecution being launched against it by [the] Registrar of Companies for alleged violation of the provisions of the Companies Act of 2013 and the Companies (Appointment and Disqualification of Directors) Rules of 2014."  One of those questions was as to why the company had not disclosed complete information on stock options of its parent holding company — CTS Corporation in the United States — having been given to the employees, including its directors, and the payments running to several hundred crores of rupees (approx US $40 million) having been paid to the parent company in the US towards stock compensating recharge.

Discrimination 
In 2018 a race discrimination suit was brought: "Three hundred former employees claim they were forced out of their jobs and replaced with 'less qualified' Indians after being poorly treated by their Indian supervisors and colleagues, given unjustifiably low performance ratings and denied promotions." Cognizant said it was "national origin" and not race.

Layoffs 
200 senior executives, above the Director's Level were dismissed because they were not able to catch up with the latest technologies. The number of the executives that were dismissed is unusually high and questions the ability of the company to catch up with the latest technologies.

In 2017, eight employees filed petitions with the labor department, complaining Cognizant forced them to resign as part of a performance-based review. The labor department closed the case in favor of employees and advised company management to give one more opportunity for the petitioners to prove themselves. At the time Cognizant had also rolled out a ‘voluntary separation program’ for directors, associate vice-presidents and senior VP's which offed them 6–9 months of their salary.

In 2017, approximately 6000 Cognizant employees in Hyderabad/Bangalore/Chennai lost their job as a part of company's annual performance review process.

Tax evasion 
The Income Tax department has frozen Cognizant Technology Solutions Corp's bank accounts and deposits in Chennai and Mumbai for allegedly evading a dividend distribution tax (DDT). A Cognizant spokesman confirmed the report and said in a statement that a court has instructed the tax department not to take further action pending further hearings. Cognizant failed to pay the tax of more than 25 billion rupees ($385 million) in the 2016-17 financial year, according to The Hindu, citing officials from the tax department.

The court asked the company to deposit 15 percent of the disputed tax, amounting to 4.9 billion rupees ($75 million) as security deposit till it decides on the case.

Ireland

Working conditions 
In February 2018 the UK and Irish press expressed concerns about contractors employed by Cognizant in Dublin as part of the outsourcing contract with Google about the conditions of employment in relationship to compensation and basic employment allowances like sick leave.

United States

Corruption 
In 2016, Cognizant announced that it was cooperating with US authorities in an investigation related to the Foreign Corrupt Practices Act, and carrying out its own probe to determine whether some payments made in India breached the law. The company also said President Gordon Coburn had resigned and would be replaced by Rajeev Mehta.

Crawford & Company lawsuit 
Cognizant has been sued by Crawford & Company, the US-based independent providers of insurance claims-handling services, for alleged breach of contract. Cognizant had been mandated by Crawford to implement PeopleSoft Financials software as part of an ERP project called Project Atlas that it was critical to Crawford's operations. Project Atlas included components for both internal operations and client-facing services.

Wage theft and H-1B visa violations 
Cognizant leads the ranks of companies receiving H-1B visas from the United States. The company has been steadily increasing its U.S. work force. In January 2011, the company announced plans to expand its U.S. delivery centers, including a new 1,000-person (0.4% of worldwide workforce) facility in Phoenix, Arizona. In February 2011, Cognizant said it had 60 full-time recruiters actively hiring in the U.S.

In 2009, an investigation by the US Department of Labor (DoL) found Cognizant in violation of the H-1B provisions of the Immigration and Nationality Administrative Act. The DoL discovered that the company had stolen wages and benefits from 67 of its workers, for which they demanded they repay $509,607 in back wages. Joseph Petrecca, the director of the Wage and Hour Division's Northern New Jersey District Office noted that the company took immediate steps to correct the violations, saying the "level of cooperation sets a standard for others in the industry."

In 2016, the company was the subject of a lawsuit by workers for Walt Disney World who said workers from India were brought into the United States on H-1B visas in order to replace them. However, in October 2016, federal Judge Gregory A. Presnel of the United States District Court in Orlando dismissed the lawsuits, stating "none of the allegedly false statements put at issue in the complaint are adequate."

Cognizant was also required to pay $5.7 million in back pay and fines in a U.S. District Court ruling for a class action lawsuit. The lawsuit claimed that Cognizant did not provide quality assurance analysts the full value of their overtime pay.

Working conditions and mental health issues 

In February 2019, an investigative report by The Verge described poor working conditions in Cognizant's Phoenix, Arizona, office. Cognizant employees tasked with content moderation for Facebook developed mental health issues, including posttraumatic stress disorder, as a result of exposure to graphic violence, hate speech, and conspiracy theories in the videos they were instructed to evaluate. Moderators at the Phoenix office reported drug abuse, alcohol abuse, and sexual intercourse in the workplace, and feared retaliation from terminated workers who threatened to harm them. In response, a Cognizant representative stated the company would examine the issues in the report.

The Verge published a follow-up investigation of Cognizant's Tampa, Florida, office in June 2019. Employees in the Tampa location described working conditions that were worse than the conditions in the Phoenix office. Content moderator Keith Utley suffered a heart attack while working for Cognizant in March 2018 and died in a hospital; the Tampa office lacked an on-site defibrillator. Moderators were required to sign non-disclosure agreements with Cognizant to obtain the job, although three former workers broke the agreements to provide information to The Verge. In the Tampa office, workers reported bed bugs, unsanitary work conditions, inadequate mental health resources, sexual harassment, workplace violence, and theft. As a result of exposure to videos depicting graphic violence, animal abuse, and child sexual abuse, some employees developed psychological trauma and posttraumatic stress disorder. Cognizant sanitized the office before The Verges visit, a practice the publication described as a "dog-and-pony-show phenomenon". In response to negative coverage related to its content moderation contracts, a Facebook director indicated that Facebook is in the process of developing a "global resiliency team" that would assist its contractors.

On October 30, 2019, Cognizant announced that it would phase out a portion of its content moderation contracts in 2020.

See also 

 Disney litigation
 Tech companies in the New York City metropolitan region

References

External links
 
 

 

Consulting firms established in 1994
Companies based in Bergen County, New Jersey
International information technology consulting firms
Information technology consulting firms of the United States
Management consulting firms of the United States
Outsourcing companies
American companies established in 1994
1994 establishments in New Jersey
Teaneck, New Jersey
Dun & Bradstreet
Corporate spin-offs
1998 initial public offerings
Technology companies established in 1994